Bisten may refer to:

Bist (river) on the France-Germany border
Bisten-en-Lorraine, a village in northeastern France
Bisten, Saarland, a village in western Germany